Abū Yaʿlā Muḥammad ibn al-Ḥusayn Ibn al-Farrāʾ (April 990 – 15 August 1066), commonly known as al-Qāḍī Abū Yaʿlā or simply as Ibn al-Farrāʾ, is a great Hanbali Jurist, Athari theologian and a major authority in the Hanbali school of Jurisprudence, titled by some as 'The Pillar of the School'.
From amongst his students was the great Imam Mahfūz al Kalwadhānī, another leading major Hanbali  scholar.

He is also a prominent theologian whose works are favoured and taught by Hanbali jurists, but are also sometimes used by Ash'ari theologians. However, despite rejecting anthropomorphism and corporealism in the totality of his works, he has briefly expressed a preference for viewing corporealism as indeed necessary in the end of his book Ibtal al-ta'wilat where he also affirms very dubious hadiths. This has caused a major controversy at his time and prompted Ibn al-Jawzi to write his book  to repel the popular belief that most Hanbali jurists are anthropomorphist. That said, Abū Yaʿlā remains a major authority and his other theological works studied.

Works
al-Qāḍī Abū Yaʿlā authored many works, including:
 Kitāb al-muʿtamad fī uṣūl al-dīn
 al-Aḥkām al-sulṭāniyya
 Ibṭāl al-taʾwīlāt li-aḫbār al-ṣifāt
 al-ʿUdda fī uṣūl al-fiqh

See also
Hanbali
List of Islamic scholars

References

11th-century Muslim scholars of Islam
Sunni Muslim scholars of Islam
Atharis
1066 deaths
990 births
11th-century jurists